Gisborne is a former New Zealand parliamentary electorate. It existed from 1908 to 1996, and it was represented by 12 Members of Parliament.

Population centres
In the 1907 electoral redistribution, a major change that had to be allowed for was a reduction of the tolerance to ±750 to those electorates where the country quota applied. The North Island had once again a higher population growth than the South Island, and three seats were transferred from south to north. In the resulting boundary distribution, every existing electorate was affected, and three electorates were established for the first time, including the Taumarunui electorate.

The city of Gisborne was located within the electorate. In the initial area covered by the electorate, the city was located near the electorate's northern border, and it went as far south as just short of Bay View. Wairoa was thus also located within the initial area.

In the 1911 electoral redistribution, the southern boundary shifted north significantly, and Wairoa was lost to the  electorate. In the 1918 electoral redistribution, the Gisborne electorate lost large inland areas, but re-gained Wairoa. In the 1922 electoral redistribution, changes to the boundaries were minimal, and in the 1927 electoral redistribution, the electorate was left unaltered.

In the 1937 electoral redistribution, large inland areas were gained and Wairoa lost. The changes in the 1946 electoral redistribution were most significant, with the city of Gisborne now located near the southern boundary of the electorate, and all of the East Cape being gained. The electorate now included the settlements of Te Karaka, Matawai, Tolaga Bay, and Tokomaru Bay.

History
The electorate existed from 1908 to 1996, when it was replaced by the Mahia electorate, which was renamed East Coast from 2002. Douglas Lysnar represented the Gisborne electorate from 1919 to 1931, when he was defeated.

In the 1928 contest Lysnar stood as an Independent supporter of the Reform Party and was successful. During 1930, he stopped supporting the Reform Party and became fully independent. At the following election in 1931 he ran as an Independent, but was not returned, beaten by Labour's David Coleman.

Members of Parliament
Key

Election results

1943 election

1938 election

1935 election

1931 election

1928 election

1922 election

1919 election

Notes

References

Historical electorates of New Zealand
Gisborne District
1908 establishments in New Zealand
1996 disestablishments in New Zealand